Torleiv Ole Rognum (born 9 April 1948) is a Norwegian physician and politician for the Christian Democratic Party.

He took the dr.med. degree as a cancer researcher in 1982, and but was appointed as an associate professor at the Institute of Forensic Medicine, Oslo in 1984. He was promoted to professor in 1991. He has also worked at the Institute of Pathology, University of Oslo, and at the hospital Rikshospitalet. He also aids the National Criminal Investigation Service in forensic identification.

He chaired the Norwegian Biotechnology Advisory Board from 1998 to 2000, and was later deputy chair. He is a member of Asker municipal council. He served as a deputy representative to the Parliament of Norway from Akershus during the term 2009–2013.

In 2007 he was decorated as a Knight, First Class of the Order of St. Olav.

References

1948 births
Living people
Norwegian pathologists
Academic staff of the University of Oslo
Asker politicians
Christian Democratic Party (Norway) politicians
Deputy members of the Storting